The Saint Andrew's Society of the State of New York is the oldest charitable institution in the state of New York and is focused on helping Scots in the New York community.

History
The organization was founded in 1756 by Scottish founders in New York City who were looking to "relieve the distressed."  It was named for the patron saint of Scotland, Saint Andrew.  Past presidents of the society include Philip Livingston (the first president), William Alexander (the "Earl of Stirling"), Andrew Carnegie and Ward Melville,. Past members include Alexander Hamilton, Lewis Morris, the Rev. John Witherspoon, the Rev. Dr. David H. C. Read and John Stewart Kennedy.

In 1897, the organization revised its constitution to expand eligibility for membership to lineal descendant of a Scot, not just a son or grandson of a Scot. In 1966, more than 800 members and guests honored Saint Andrew, the patron saint with its 210th anniversary dinner at the Waldorf Astoria hotel in Manhattan.

In 1993, there were 980 members of the Society.  In 2010, the constitution is again revised, this time allowing women to be admitted into membership in the society with Margaret "Peggy" Macmillan becoming the first woman to be admitted.

Leadership

Present day
The society still provides for needy Scots in New York City via its almoners program and has a scholarship program that allows two Scots to attend graduate school in the USA and three American students of Scottish lineage to attend graduate school at a Scottish institution of higher learning.

Social events for the Society include the Tartan Day parade in April and an annual banquet in November.  The Society sponsors a Kirkin' o' the Tartan service during Tartan Week in April of each year. The Society offices are located on East 55th Street in Manhattan, which houses a collection of books about Scotland.

See also 
 Saint Andrew's Society
 St. Andrew's Society of Montreal

References
Notes

Sources

External links

Charities based in New York City
1756 establishments in the Province of New York